Sofía Rivera Torres (born Sofía Rivera Torres Martin del Campo, San Diego, California, September 18, 1992) is an American TV presenter, radio host, internet celebrity and reality television personality. She is of Mexican-American ethnicity.

Rivera Torres married TV Presenter Eduardo Videgaray in a small ceremony in Mexico City on October, 2020

Career 
Rivera Torres began her television career in 2014, as the host for All Access, an EDM TV Show which aired through E! Entertainment Television Latin America. The following year, she hosted The Release, also an EDM TV Show, produced by Vice Media and broadcast through Canal Sony. In 2016 she joined Imagen Noticias as entertainment news presenter, aired through Imagen Televisión. and started in the reality television show El Mundo Real through Facebook Watch.

Rivera Torres regularly contributes as a writer for Excélsior Mexican newspaper and has performed in two feature films: Café Con Leche Directed by Ray Gallardo and El Vestido directed by Roque Falabella.

Currently, she co-hosts Imagen Televisión's late night talkshow ¡Qué Importa! and most recently, Rivera Torres joined the cast of Si nos dejan a Spanish-language telenovela that premiered on Univision on 1 June 2021 portraying Mabe Rangel .

References 

American actresses of Mexican descent
Television personalities from California
1992 births
Living people
People from San Diego County, California
American television hosts
American radio hosts
American women television personalities
American women radio presenters
American women television presenters
21st-century American actresses
American film actresses
The Real World (TV series) cast members